Jail Caesar is a 2012 British-South African-Canadian historical drama film written and directed by Paul Schoolman and starring Derek Jacobi, John Kani and Alice Krige.

Plot

Cast
Derek Jacobi as Sulla
John Kani as Marius
Alice Krige as Pirate Captain
Warren Adler as Caesar
Peter John Christiaans as Cicero
Richard Clifford as Marcus Thermus
Grant Swamby as Crassus
Gunter Singer as The Swooper
Vaneshran Arumugam as Cinna
Grethe Fox as Nicopolis
Bo Petersen as Aurelia
Denwor Ohlson as Mr. O

References

External links
 
 
 

English-language South African films
English-language Canadian films
Afrikaans-language films
Xhosa-language films
British historical drama films
Canadian historical drama films
South African drama films
Films about Julius Caesar
2010s English-language films
2010s Canadian films
2010s British films